Dirty Work in a Laundry is a 1915 short comedy film featuring Ford Sterling and Minta Durfee. It was rereleased in 1918 as The Desperate Scoundrel.

Cast
 Ford Sterling
 Minta Durfee
Harry Bernard

See also
 List of American films of 1915

References

External links

1915 films
1915 comedy films
1915 short films
American silent short films
American black-and-white films
Silent American comedy films
American comedy short films
1910s American films